A Day in the Hayfields is a 1904 British silent documentary film directed by Cecil M. Hepworth filmed on location in the United Kingdom.

Synopsis

This is a documentary film showing the process of making hay as it was in the early 20th century United Kingdom.  The cutting, gathering and stacking processes are all documented.  At the end there is a shot of children playing in the newly mown hay.  This film is significant in its depiction of pre-mechanized agriculture using horses instead of powered farm equipment.

References

External links
 

1904 films
1904 short films
British black-and-white films
British documentary films
Agriculture in the United Kingdom
History of agriculture in England
History of agriculture in the United Kingdom